Utricularia volubilis, the twining bladderwort, is a perennial, affixed aquatic carnivorous plant that belongs to the genus Utricularia (family Lentibulariaceae). It is endemic to the southwestern coastal region of Western Australia.

See also 
 List of Utricularia species

References 

Carnivorous plants of Australia
Eudicots of Western Australia
volubilis
Lamiales of Australia